The , also known as Supersonic, is an annual two- or three-day rock festival held at the same time in Osaka and Chiba, Japan. The majority of the bands playing in Osaka the first day go to Chiba the following day and vice versa. The line-up contains Japanese rock musicians from major and independent record companies, plus international acts. In 2017, the festival was expanded to include Shanghai, China.

History
Summer Sonic Festival was founded in 2000 in Japan, by Naoki Shimizu, CEO of Tokyp promotions company Creativeman Productions Ltd. Addressing the ever-growing demand for western music, the festival drew established and emerging musical acts of most genres to become, by 2010, Japan's biggest music event.

The Chiba event takes place every August at the massive Makuhari Messe convention center, which overlooks Tokyo Bay, and at the Zozo Marine Stadium. In Osaka, the venue is Maishima Sonic Park. At all venues, there is always a large arena main stage and several other smaller stages.

In 2011, the festival established Sonicmania, whose focus is on Electronic dance music (EDM). It is held at Makuhari Messe the day before the festival.

In 2012, Creativeman formed a joint venture with Live Nation Entertainment. In 2014, Live Nation bought full control of the festival.

The 2020 festival was cancelled due to the COVID-19 pandemic, but a truncated version, branded as 'Supersonic', took place in September 2021 with restrictions in place and a typhoon affecting day one. Possibly because of the logistics of moving people around during a pandemic, the 2021 line-up was mainly electronic. Controversy arose when some international DJs were allowed into Japan without having to quarantine.

Performances 
Line-ups for the festival in past years are as follows, the artists that in bold are the headlining acts for that year.

2000

2001

2002

2003

2004

2005

2006

2007

2008

2009

2010

2011

2012

2013

2014

2015

2016

2017

2018

2019

2020 
Canceled due to the Covid 19 pandemic.

2021

2022

2023

See also

List of historic rock festivals
List of music festivals

Notes

References

External links 

 Official site (in Japanese)
 Official site 2009 (in English)
 Official site 2008 (in English)
 Official site 2007 (in English)

Music festivals in Japan
Summer festivals
Rock festivals in Japan
Tourist attractions in Chiba Prefecture
Chiba (city)
Konohana-ku, Osaka
Tourist attractions in Osaka
Festivals in Osaka Prefecture
Electronic music festivals in Japan
Music festivals established in 2000
Music festivals in China